Steffen Brandt  (born 14 June 1953 in Åbyhøj) is a Danish singer-songwriter and composer. Since 1981 he has been lead singer of rock group TV-2, as he also wrote both text and music to all the group's songs.

In 2003 he received the Modersmål language award for his contribution to music in the Danish language.

References

External links 
 

20th-century Danish male singers
1953 births
Living people
Danish  male singer-songwriters
Singers from Aarhus